Alfredo E. Evangelista (September 22, 1926 – October 18, 2008) was a Filipino archeologist and former director of the Anthropology division of the National Museum of the Philippines.

Biography
Alfredo Esguerra Evangelista was born in Davao City on September 22, 1926. He completed his primary and secondary education in Davao City. His parents, Catalino N. Evangelista from Pangasinan and Filomena S. Esguerra from Dumaguete City, initially did not support the idea of him becoming an archaeologist; instead, they wanted him to be a lawyer.

He was married to Perfecta Gonzales.

He continued to head the Anthropology Division of the National Museum of the Philippines until his retirement as its deputy director in 1989.

Alfredo E. Evangelista died at his home in San Pedro, Laguna, on October 18, 2008, at the age of 82.

Educational Background

Evangelista obtained his bachelor's degree in History from the University of the East in 1953. He then earned his master's degree in anthropology in 1959 from the University of Chicago under the Fulbright Program. He joined the National Museum of the Philippines following his graduation from Chicago.

Evangelista's first encounter with archaeology came to him at the University of the East, when Wilhelm Solheim taught a Social Science course there. It was this encounter that led Evangelista and many other Filipinos to the field of Archaeology.

In November 1949, while an undergraduate student, Evangelista and his classmate Arsenio Manuel were chosen by Wilhelm Solheim to participate in archaeological digs supervised by Professor H. Otley Beyer. He and his team excavated sites from the Bondoc Peninsula up to the Batungan Mountain range in Masbate. There they uncovered pottery specimens dating back to the Neolithic age.

Works and Contributions

Evangelista came into contact with archaeology in 1951, when he was a student of Wilhelm Solheim, who taught Anthropology. Solheim asked for volunteers who were available that summer to accompany him out on the field to Batungan Mountain in Masbate, and Evangelista volunteered. Evangelista defined this episode as the moment when his passion for archaeology started. Solheim's wife even talked to the Director of the National Museum at that time, Dr. Quisumbing, asking if Evangelista could be nominated Laboratory Helper. During the Masbate undertaking, to which they returned to in 1953, they excavated the Makabog Burial-Jar Site together. Evangelista also assisted Solheim when they uncovered the Kalanay Cave site in 1951 and worked together for the entire excavation in 1951 and 1953.

In 1955, Evangelista excavated a site in Arroceros Forest Park in Manila, however, no published reports are found. In 1956, Evangelista and his fellow National Museum researcher, Robert Fox, undertook an archaeological excavation in Bato Caves, Sorsogon. During the excavation they found a burial jar and a stone tool assemblage.

In 1957, Evangelista excavated Carrangla in the province of Nueva Ecija. The site was a probable Neolithic jar burial site, known to have lithic tools. However, no porcelain, stoneware or metal was found. According to Solheim: "So far inland in northern Luzon has always been a puzzle."

From August to September 1961, Evangelista attended the Tenth Pacific Science Congress in Honolulu, Hawaii. Then he attended a Philippine conference in late November, where he talked about the archaeology in the Philippine Islands, its growth, development, and also its current status and problems. In December, Evangelista represented the Philippines at the International Conference on Asian Archaeology in New Delhi, India where he also presented his work and findings in the Philippines demonstrating the trade relations with Indian, Chinese and Thai sources.

From July 1973 to August 1991 Wilhelm Solheim visited him in the directors office often and saw that he was very busy in running the museum without the official position, due to the official director disliking Evangelista and thus preventing him from getting promoted. Shortly after his retirement in 1991, he started teaching at the University of Santa Thomas.

References 

1926 births
2008 deaths
Filipino anthropologists
Filipino archaeologists
University of Chicago alumni
People from Davao City
People from San Pedro, Laguna
Filipino explorers
University of the East alumni
20th-century archaeologists
20th-century anthropologists
Fulbright alumni